Barskoye is a rural locality (a village) in Prigorodnoye Rural Settlement, Sokolsky District, Vologda Oblast, Russia. The population was 16 as of 2002.

Geography 
Barskoye is located 11 km southeast of Sokol (the district's administrative centre) by road. Shastovo is the nearest rural locality.

References 

Rural localities in Sokolsky District, Vologda Oblast